Pavel Sergeevich Akolzin (born 25 November 1990) is a Russian-born Kazakhstani professional ice hockey player. He is currently playing under contract with Metallurg Magnitogorsk in the Kontinental Hockey League (KHL).

Playing career
Akolzin formerly played with Barys Nur-Sultan in the KHL and Beibarys Atyrau, Arlan Kokshetau and Nomad Astana of the Kazakhstan Hockey Championship.

Following four seasons in the KHL with Barys Nur-Sultan, Akolzin left the club as a free agent and was signed to a two-year contract to continue in the KHL with Russian club, Metallurg Magnitogorsk on 1 May 2021.

Career statistics

International

References

External links 

1990 births
Living people
Arlan Kokshetau players
Barys Nur-Sultan players
Beibarys Atyrau players
Nomad Astana players
Russian ice hockey right wingers
Kazakhstani ice hockey players
Ice hockey people from Moscow
Metallurg Magnitogorsk players
Universiade silver medalists for Kazakhstan
Universiade medalists in ice hockey
Competitors at the 2017 Winter Universiade
Kazakhstani people of Russian descent